Bistolida diauges, common name: the square-spotted cowry or translucent stolida, is a species of sea snail, a marine gastropod mollusc in the family Cypraeidae, the cowries.

Description
The shell reaches  in length. It is elongate pyriform with rather long teeth. The basic colour is yellowish or greyish, with brown compact spot on the dorsum. The base colour is yellowish. The mantle of the animal is whitish.

Distribution and habitat
This species can be found in the Red Sea and in the Western Indian Ocean, in seas along Kenya and Tanzania.

Bistolida diagues can be encountered both in shallow muddy waters with seaweeds and in deeper waters.

References

External links
 Biolib
 Bistolida diagues

Cypraeidae
Gastropods described in 1888